János Derzsi (born 20 April 1954 in Nyírábrány) is a Hungarian actor. He has appeared in more than eighty films since 1979.

Selected filmography

References

External links
 

1954 births
Living people
Hungarian male film actors
People from Hajdú-Bihar County